Sik Kong Wai is a walled village in Ha Tsuen, Yuen Long District, Hong Kong.

Administration
Sik Kong Wai is a recognized village under the New Territories Small House Policy.

History
Sik Kong Wai was one of the old villages of the Tang Clan who moved from Kam Tin in the late 14th and early 15th centuries. The village was founded by the descendents of Tang Tiu-yuet.

See also
 Walled villages of Hong Kong
 San Wai (Ha Tsuen)
 Sik Kong Tsuen

References

External links

 Delineation of area of existing village Sik Kong Wai (Ha Tsuen) for election of resident representative (2019 to 2022)
 Antiquities and Monuments Office. Hong Kong Traditional Chinese Architectural Information System. Sik Kong Wai
 Antiquities Advisory Board. Historic Building Appraisal. Yeung Hau Temple, Sik Kong Wai Pictures
 Antiquities Advisory Board. Pictures of the shrine
 Webpage featuring Sik Kong Wai 

Walled villages of Hong Kong
Ha Tsuen
Villages in Yuen Long District, Hong Kong